Fahad bin Al-Harifi bin Fahad Al-Husseini Al-Bishi (born 10 September 1965) is a former Saudi footballer who played for Al-Nassr and the Saudi Arabia national team. He represented his country at the 1994 FIFA World Cup.

Club career

Early career
when he was young kid, Fahad played from Al-Nak'el Club, he moved to Al-Nassr was a small player in the Age 16 years old. Paulo César Carpegiani the coach gave him to chance to play in 1984 to prove his presence with the team.

Al-Nassr
First official goal scored by a player the team had before the agreement the Saudi city of Dammam, where he scored one of the goals of four Saudi victory in a match which ended outcome 4–1 on 29 August 1984.

Register for a team victory (74) goal is relatively low due to his participation with the team victory for three years, where he made the Union Saudi request to retire from football after a dispute with management victory. And have been approved for retirement and when he decided to return to his team rejected the Saudi and especially a member of the Saudi Federation (Saleh bin Nasser), but after three years of retirement speech. Although this article applies to the player who wants to return for another team is his team. As his team return to it whenever he wants. No longer to post victory, but after three years.

International career
Such as the Saudi team for youth in 1985 and participated in the AFC Youth Championship, which was held in the UAE participated in the World Youth Cup in Moscow In 1986 joined the team first and announced his retirement from international partnerships in 1994 after participating actively in the World Cup in America.

He participated in many local tournaments and international and achieved with club and country many tournaments and achievements have won with the team championship 1988 AFC Asian Cup in Qatar and was the owner of the winning goal against team China as well as the owner penalty-kick shootout last in the final match against South Korean which the continental trophy to Saudi Arabia for the second time in a row, the solution with the team in the Asian after the Japanese team in the 1992 AFC Asian Cup in Japan, which won the Golden Boot-winning scorer in Asia that tournament, also achieved runner-up with the team in the FIFA Confederations Cup first in 1992 after lost to Argentina in final, but his first goal in the history of the tournament in the Confederations Cup against United States, solving with the team and in the summer at the Asian Games in 1987 in Korea after Korean team, and participated in the 1994 FIFA World Cup in America and lost in 16 round.

The record for the national team (24) official goals.

International goals

Honours

Club
Al-Nassr
Saudi Premier League: 1989, 1994, 1995.
Saudi King's cup: 1986, 1987, 1990.
Saudi Federation cup: 1998.
Asian Cup Winners Cup: 1998.
Asian Super Cup: 1998.
Gulf Club Champions Cup: 1996, 1997.

National-Team
Saudi Arabia
AFC Asian Cup: 1988. Winner
AFC Asian Cup: 1992. (Runners Up)

World Cup 
1994 Lead Saudia to Second Round, beyond the Group Stages

Individual
 Asian Cup Top scorer in 1992: 3 goals
 The 2nd the best Asian player 1993
 The Best Arab countries player in 1988
 The 1st Arabian player who got Adidas Golden Boot
 The 1st player to score in the 1992 King Fahd Cup, Saudi Arabia 3-0 USA
 The 1st Asian and Arabian player to score in the FIFA Club World Cup in 1999 (in the match with Real Madrid)
 Second Top scorer in FIFA Club World Cup 2000

Nicknames
 The Musician

References

1965 births
Living people
Saudi Arabian footballers
Saudi Arabia international footballers
1988 AFC Asian Cup players
1992 King Fahd Cup players
1992 AFC Asian Cup players
1994 FIFA World Cup players
AFC Asian Cup-winning players
Bisha FC players
Al Nassr FC players
People from 'Asir Province
Asian Games medalists in football
Footballers at the 1986 Asian Games
Footballers at the 1990 Asian Games
Association football midfielders
Saudi Professional League players
Asian Games silver medalists for Saudi Arabia
Medalists at the 1986 Asian Games